Howard "Moe" Ankney (born June 23, 1942) is a former American football player and coach. He served as the head football coach at the Bowling Green State University from 1986 to 1990, compiling a record of 20–31–3.  Ankney played college football as a quarterback at Bowling Green, from which he graduated in 1964.  There he played on the 1962 Mid-American Conference championship team coached by Doyt Perry.  After coaching high school football in Ohio from 1964 to 1970, Ankney moved to the college ranks.  In addition to his head coaching stint at his alma mater, he served as a defensive assistant at Ball State University, Tulane University, the University of Arizona, Purdue University, the University of Missouri, and the University of Minnesota.
He currently resides in Oregon and is an avid golfer. He has three kids Angie, Molly and Andy. He has six grandchildren Ashley, Bryce, Collin, Hannah, Drew and Jack.

Head coaching record

References

1942 births
Living people
Arizona Wildcats football coaches
Ball State Cardinals football coaches
Bowling Green Falcons football coaches
Bowling Green Falcons football players
Minnesota Golden Gophers football coaches
Missouri Tigers football coaches
Purdue Boilermakers football coaches
Tulane Green Wave football coaches
High school football coaches in Ohio
Miami University alumni
Sportspeople from Xenia, Ohio
Players of American football from Ohio